Chipcom was an early pioneering company in the Ethernet hub industry.  Their products allowed Local Networks to be aggregated in a single place instead of being distributed across the length of a single coaxial cable. They competed with now-gone companies such as Cabletron Systems, SynOptics, Ungermann-Bass, David Systems, Digital Equipment Corporation, and American Photonics, all of which were early entrants in the "LAN Hub" industry.  Chipcom also was involved in Token Ring, FDDI, and Asynchronous Transfer Mode (ATM).

Some of Chipcom's innovations at the time are well-documented in the trade press of the era, such as Computerworld.

In 1995, Chipcom was acquired by 3Com for $700 million in stock., although Cabletron was also interested in buying the company.     3Com was acquired by Hewlett-Packard in 2011.  The firm's CEO at the time was  John Robert Held.

References

Ethernet
Networking companies of the United States
Defunct networking companies
Computer companies established in 1983
Computer companies disestablished in 1995
Defunct companies based in Massachusetts
Defunct computer companies of the United States
Defunct computer hardware companies